Blace is a village in the municipality of Brvenica, North Macedonia. It is located close to the Kosovan border.

Demographics
According to the 2002 census, the village had a total of 344 inhabitants. Ethnic groups in the village include:

Macedonians 344

References

Villages in Brvenica Municipality